Persea brenesii is a species of plant in the family Lauraceae. It is endemic to Costa Rica.

References

brenesii
Endemic flora of Costa Rica
Vulnerable plants
Taxonomy articles created by Polbot